Krung Thep Aphiwat Central Terminal, also known by its former name Bang Sue Grand Station, is the central passenger terminal in Bangkok and the current railway hub of Thailand. It replaced the existing Bangkok (Hua Lamphong) railway station as the city's central railway station with long-distance rail services operating from here from 19 January 2023. The station was opened on 2 August 2021 as part of the operation of the SRT Red Lines, and from May 2021 to September 2022 served as a COVID-19 vaccination center. It is linked to the Bang Sue MRT station via an underground walkway.

It is the largest railway station in Southeast Asia, with 26 platforms—some 600 metres long. The station will offer 274,192 m2 of usable floor space. An elevated walkway connects the station to the new Mo Chit Bus Terminal.

Currently, long-distance intercity trains terminate at this station, while ordinary and commuter trains calling at all stations continue onwards to Bangkok (Hua Lamphong) railway station and still operate at the old Bang Sue Junction railway station.

Etymology
The name Krung Thep Aphiwat means "prosperity of Bangkok". The name was chosen by King Vajiralongkorn.

History
In 2010 under the government of Prime Minister Abhisit Vejjajiva, the Ministry of Transport decided to move the Bangkok Railway Station (Hua Lamphong station) to the area of Bang Sue Junction Railway Station to be the center of the rail transport system. In 2013, work on the station started with a contract signing by the State Railway of Thailand (SRT), Sino-Thai Engineering Construction PCL, and Unique Construction and Engineering PCL for the Red Line suburban railway system project consisting of civil work for Bang Sue Grand Station and a maintenance center. In December 2020 it was announced that civil construction of the station was complete.

The station acted as a COVID-19 vaccination center from 24 May 2021 to 30 September 2022.

Trial operations of the SRT Red Lines, open to the public, began from the station on 2 August 2021.

A 33-million baht contract to install a new sign with the station's new ceremonial name was put on hold in January 2023 following public concern about the price.

Intercity services began operation from the station on 19 January 2023, with 52 long-distance trains which originally terminated at Bangkok (Hua Lamphong) moved to the station.

Layout 
The station will have four floors, three above, and one below ground:

Underground floor: Bang Sue MRT Station, on the MRT Blue Line station, and parking for 1,624 vehicles.
Ground floor: Station concourse with ticketing and waiting areas. This will be the only air-conditioned area in the station.
Second floor: Train platforms with 12 tracks. Eight tracks will serve long-distance diesel trains (soon to be electrified). Four tracks will serve SRT Red Dark and Light Red Line commuter trains.
Third floor: High–speed railway platforms with 10 tracks. Four tracks will serve the AERA1 City and the Don Mueang–Suvarnabhumi–U-Tapao high-speed railway linking Don Mueang International Airport, Suvarnabhumi Airport and U-Tapao International Airport. Six tracks are reserved for future high-speed rail (HSR) connections to Nong Khai, Padang Besar, Thailand and Chiang Mai.

Also planned is a  memorial site to King Rama V, known as the "father of Thai railroads", although this is expected to open after the station itself.

Phahonyothin Freight Yard
Bang Sue Junction is also the location of Phahonyothin cargo yard. With an expanse of about 50 rail-tracks and sidings, it is the largest rail yard in the whole of Thailand. It is located about 1.5 kilometres from the station and is the main cargo yard for freight services around Thailand.

Bus Connections 
The following BMTA and Private Jointed routes serve this station:

 3 (Kamphaeng Phet Bus Depot - Mo Chit 2 - Khlong San) 
 3 (Kamphaeng Phet Bus Depot - BTS Mochit Station) (Loop)
 16 (Kamphaeng Phet Bus Depot - Mo Chit 2 - Surawong) 
 49 (Kamphaeng Phet Bus Depot - Bangkok (Hua Lamphong) Railway Station) (Loop) 
 67 (Kamphaeng Phet Bus Depot - Central Plaza Rama III)
 77 (Central Plaza Rama III - Mo Chit 2) (Only go to Mo Chit 2)
 96 (Min Buri - Mo Chit 2) (Drop off at railway station)
 104 (Pak Kret - Mo Chit 2) (Only go to Mo Chit 2) 
 134 (Bua Thong Kheha - Mo Chit 2) (Drop off at railway station)
 136 (Khlong Toei - Mo Chit 2) (Drop off at railway station)
 138 (Phra Pradaeng Pier - Mo Chit 2) (Drop off at railway station)
 138 (Ratchapracha - Mo Chit 2) (Drop off at railway station)
 145 (Pak Nam (Praeksa Bordin) - Mo Chit 2) (Drop off at railway station)
 145 (Mega Bangna - Mo Chit 2) (Drop off at railway station)
 157 (Bang Khae - Phuttha Monthon 1 st rd. - Expressway - Victory Monument)
 170 (Phuttha Monthon 2 nd rd. - Charan Sanit Wong rd. - Mo Chit 2)
 509 (Borommaratchachonnani - Phuttha Monthon 2 nd rd. - Mo Chit 2) (Only go to Mo Chit 2)
 517 (Kamphaeng Phet Bus Depot - Mo Chit 2 - KMITL) 
 536 (Pak Nam - Expressway - Mo Chit 2) (Only go to Mo Chit 2)
 Shuttle Bus (Krung Thep Aphiwat Central Terminal - Bangkok (Hua Lamphong) Railway Station) (High-Floor Bus)
 Shuttle Bus (Krung Thep Aphiwat Central Terminal - Expressway - Bangkok (Hua Lamphong) Railway Station) (Low-Floor Bus)

Gallery

See also 

 List of railway stations in Thailand
 Bang Sue Junction railway station
 Bangkok (Hua Lamphong) railway station

References 

Airport Rail Link (Bangkok) stations
Railway stations in Bangkok
SRT Red Lines
Railway stations in Thailand opened in 2021